A House Is Not a Home is a 1964 drama film loosely based on the 1953 autobiography by madam Polly Adler. The film stars Shelley Winters, Robert Taylor, Cesar Romero, and Kaye Ballard. Raquel Welch made her film debut in a small role as a call girl. The song written for the film by Burt Bacharach and Hal David has become a standard.

Plot
Polly Adler is a poor Polish immigrant who works in a sweatshop. She loses her job after she is sexually assaulted by her boss, for which her housemates blame her. She then is forced to move out.

Her next apartment is in a building owned by Frank Costigan, a gangster. Frank approves of Polly's attractive girlfriends and pays her to have the ladies go out socially with his friends.

One thing leads to another, and soon Polly is the madam of a bordello. She has genuine feelings for musician Casey Booth, but does not reveal her true occupation to him.

Costigan becomes the top enforcer for mob boss Lucky Luciano and backs Polly's business, which ends up on Park Avenue offering high-class call girls. Casey proposes marriage, so Polly finally confesses what she does for a living. He is willing to overlook it, but Polly feels it is for the best if they part.

Cast

Award nominations
Edith Head was nominated for the Academy Award for Best Costume Design, Black-and-White.

External links
 
 

1964 films
1964 drama films
American independent films
American black-and-white films
Drama films based on actual events
Films directed by Russell Rouse
Films set in New York City
Films set in the 1920s
Films about prostitution in the United States
American drama films
Embassy Pictures films
1960s English-language films
1960s American films